Owl City is a electronic-pop band formed by American singer-songwriter Adam Young. Owl City was created in Owatonna, Minnesota, in 2007 out of his parents basement. He began posting music on social media platform MySpace when he gained popularity and signed with recording records Republic Records. Owl City had a hit song in 2009 named "Fireflies" from his album "Ocean Eyes". This song received an overwhelming amount of praise and quickly rose to the top of the charts. It was certified diamond after selling 10 million units. Owl City quickly raised in popularity and was a very popular band through the years of 2009-2018. The last album they released was in 2018 titled "Cinematic", making it their 7th album. There was an EP released by Owl City on February 3, 2023, titled "Adam, Check Please" containing two songs titled "Adam, Check Please" and "Kelly Time".

2009 tours  

Owl City has toured several countries such as North America, Europe, Asia, Australia, and New Zealand. This list contains a collection of tours that Owl City has completed between the years of 2009 and 2018. The list contains the date, city, country, and venue performed in. It also contains everyone who opened for Owl City throughout all of the tours, such as Kate Havnevik and Unicorn Kid in 2009, and The Scene Aesthetic also in 2009. Owl City is no longer on tour, but they have made their mark in music history by becoming a certified Diamond artist. There is a website named Owl City Music that contains merchandise you can purchase such as water bottles, t-shirts, posters, albums, wrapping paper, and sunglasses.

2010 tours

2011 tours

2012 tours

2013 tours

2014 tours

2015 tours

2018 tours

Notes

References

External links 

 

Lists of concert tours
Concert tours